Raymond Joseph Thomas (July 9, 1910 – December 6, 1993) was a Major League Baseball catcher. He played professionally for the Brooklyn Dodgers during the 1930s.

Early life and career
Thomas was born in Dover, New Hampshire and played college baseball at Western State Teachers College from 1930 to 1933.

He was signed by the St. Louis Cardinals as a free agent in 1933. He played for the Huntington Red Birds in 1934, the Houston Buffaloes in 1935 and the Cedar Rapids Kernels in 1936 and 1937. Thomas was granted free agency by the Cardinals on April 1, 1938.

Thomas was signed by the Dodgers on April 1, 1938 and played in one game for the Dodgers on July 22, 1938. He had one hit in three at-bats in that game and scored one run. He returned to the minors and played his last game for the Raleigh Capitals in 1946. He had a brief run as a manager in the minor leagues before retiring from baseball.

Thomas died on December 6, 1993 in Wilson, North Carolina.

See also
 History of the Brooklyn Dodgers

References

External links

Major League Baseball catchers
Brooklyn Dodgers players
Baseball players from New Hampshire
Minor league baseball managers
1910 births
1993 deaths
Western Michigan Broncos baseball players
Huntington Red Birds players
Houston Buffaloes players
Cedar Rapids Raiders players
Elmira Pioneers players
Dallas Steers players
Hartford Bees players
Albany Senators players
Scranton Red Sox players
Raleigh Capitals players
People from Dover, New Hampshire
Sportspeople from Strafford County, New Hampshire